Anapsky (masculine), Anapskaya (feminine), or Anapskoye (neuter) is the name of several rural localities in Krasnodar Krai, Russia:
Anapsky, Korenovsky District, Krasnodar Krai, a khutor in Novoberezansky Rural Okrug of Korenovsky District
Anapsky, Krymsky District, Krasnodar Krai, a khutor in Keslerovsky Rural Okrug of Krymsky District
Anapskaya, a stanitsa in Anapsky Rural Okrug of Anapsky District of Krasnodar Krai